Linus Dotson (born March 4, 1973), better known by his stage name Linus of Hollywood, is an American singer, songwriter, multi-instrumentalist, and record producer. The stage name comes from his early days in Los Angeles, where he would frequently wear striped shirts similar to the Peanuts character Linus van Pelt. He is currently a member of Nerf Herder and comedy duo Jarinus.

Career

Early life
Dotson was born in Omaha, Nebraska, but spent his formative years in Florida. At age five, he learned to play guitar. He would later learn to play drums, bass, and piano as well. At age 21, he moved to Los Angeles to pursue a career in music. In 1995 Dotson started his professional career as the leader of punk/pop band Size 14, named after his shoe size. The band broke up in 1998 and Dotson began playing and producing on other people's recordings.

Solo career
In 1999, Dotson released his first solo album Your Favorite Record on his own label called Franklin Castle Recordings. He performed nearly everything on the album, both instrumentally and vocally. He has since released four more albums: Let Yourself Be Happy (2001), Triangle (2006), Attractive Singles (2008), and Reheat & Serve (2008). The single for "A Girl That I Like" was released in 2011.

Dotson released his fourth solo album in 2014 titled Something Good.

As a touring musician
In the mid 2000s, Dotson played bass guitar for Paul Gilbert on the Burning Organ tour (2002), Acoustic Samurai tour (2003), and the Space Ship One tour (2005). He also played bass for Roger Joseph Manning, Jr. on both of his tours.

Work with other artists
Artists Dotson has worked with: Allstar Weekend, 5 Seconds of Summer, Mr. Big, Bowling for Soup, Cheap Trick, The Charlatans, The Dollyrots, Gabriel Mann (of The Rescues), Gush, Jennifer Lopez, Jennifer Love Hewitt, Kaela Kimura, Kiera Chaplin, Kool Keith, Kylee, Laura Dawn, Lil' Kim, The Leftovers, Margo Guryan, MC Lars, Mis-Teeq, Nerf Herder, Ol' Dirty Bastard, OPM, Parry Gripp, Paul Gilbert, People on Vacation, Probyn Gregory (of The Wondermints), Puffy AmiYumi, Roger Joseph Manning, Jr., Rx Bandits, Puff Daddy, The Smashing Pumpkins, Tim Burgess, and Wisely.

In 2010 he formed the band Palmdale with former Letters to Cleo vocalist/songwriter Kay Hanley and released two EPs, Get Wasted and How To Be Mean.

Television
Dotson co-wrote the theme song for Nickelodeon's School of Rock and writes music for the show as well. He composed for Mattel's "Team Hot Wheels", "Battleclaw," and "Barbie Spy Squad." His solo music has been included in the TV shows Weeds, Californication, and The New Normal. He also appeared as an actor in the season finale episode of The New Normal and performed in an episode of TNT's Rizzoli & Isles.

Dotson is the co-owner of pop/punk label Crappy Records with Bowling for Soup frontman Jaret Reddick.

Bands

Discography

Size 14
 Size 14 (1997)

Solo albums
 Your Favorite Record (1999)
 Let Yourself Be Happy (2001)
 Triangle (2006)
 Attractive Singles (2008)
 Reheat & Serve (2008)
 Something Good (2014)
 Cabin Life (2018)

Jarinus
 Parry Gripp Birthday Song (2010)
 "Jarinus Rhymes With Vaginus" (2011)

Palmdale
 Get Wasted (EP, 2010)
 How To Be Mean (EP, 2010)

Other appearances
 Margo Guryan – "Shine" (2000)
 Margo Guryan – "Sunday Morning"
 Paul Gilbert – Burning Organ (2002) – Keyboards, backing vocals, engineer
 Paul Gilbert – Acoustic Samurai (2003)
 Tim Burgess – "We All Need Love" – I Believe (2003) – Writing credits
 Tim Burgess – "Years Ago" – I Believe (2003) – Writing credits
 Paul Gilbert – "Time to Let You Go" – Gilbert Hotel (2003) – Guitars and vocals
 Mis-Teeq – "Style (Linus of Hollywood's Rock Mix)" – Eye Candy (2003)
 The Charlatans – "Try Again Today" – Up at the Lake (2004) – Writing credits 
 Paul Gilbert – Space Ship One (2005) – Bass guitar
 Darling Thieves – Embrace the Curse (2007) – Producer
 Kaela Kimura – "Magic Music" – Scratch (2007) – Writing credits
 MC Lars – This Gigantic Robot Kills (2009)
 Kaela Kimura – "Magic Music" – 5 Years (2010) – Writing credits
 People on Vacation – The Carry On EP (2011)

References

External links
 Official Website

1973 births
Living people
American male composers
21st-century American composers
Songwriters from Nebraska
Record producers from Nebraska
Musicians from Omaha, Nebraska
Nerf Herder members
21st-century American singers
21st-century American male singers
American male songwriters